The smooth-eye poacher (Xeneretmus leiops) is a fish in the family Agonidae. It was described by Charles Henry Gilbert in 1915. It is a marine, Temperate water-dwelling fish which is known from southern British Columbia, Canada to southern California, USA, in the eastern Pacific Ocean. It dwells at a depth range of 37–399 metres. Males can reach a maximum total length of 24 centimetres.

References

Smooth-eye poacher
Fish described in 1915